Lạng Sơn is a province in northern Vietnam. Lạng Sơn province is bordered by Cao Bằng province, Bắc Giang province, Bắc Kạn province, Quảng Ninh province, Thái Nguyên province, and China's Guangxi province. The province covers an area of 8310.09 square kilometres and as of 2008 it had a population of 781,655.

Friendship Gate, the historical land link between China and Vietnam, links Lạng Sơn and Guangxi, China. Being a border province, it is important for trade between the two countries. It is accessible by road and rail from Hanoi, the Vietnamese capital, and it is the northernmost point on National Route 1.
Lạng Sơn's economy is 80% based on agriculture and forestry. However, in recent years economic development has received full attention to exploit its rich mineral resources.

The most important tree grown in the province is the star anise (Illicium verum, Hooker), an important spice; an evergreen tree which has aromatic lanceolate leaves.

Important historical places of interest in the province are the war-ravaged Đồng Đăng border town, which has rich war history and attracts visitors, two large limestone caves within a short distance from the Lạng Sơn town, and a 16th-century citadel of the Ming dynasty.

History

Until the Nguyen dynasty
The history of the province is the history of Lạng Sơn town. Ancient history is traced to the Bronze Age. This period is marked by the trade route that existed between China and India that passed from the Red River Delta through Nanning to Guangzhou. 7,000–9,000 years ago the limestone caves of the province were inhabited by early settlers of the Bac Son culture.

The Dinh kings (968-980) encouraged the growth of trade in the region and requested the Sung emperors of China that they establish trade relations at Yong Zhou. The Chinese Annals have revealed that the Vietnamese traded perfumes, elephant ivories, rhinoceros horns, gold, silver and salt in return for Chinese fabrics. Later, under the Lý dynasty an extensive market was established at Vĩnh Bình on the Kỳ Cùng River.

On 4 April 1406, as a Chinese Ming envoy crossed the border into Lạng Sơn, Hồ Quý Ly's forces ambushed them and killed the Trần prince that the Ming were escorting back. Consequently, the Yongle Emperor (of Ming China) launched a punitive expedition against him due to this hostile act. During the reign of the Ming dynasty, during the period 1527 and 1592, Lạng Sơn was vastly fortified in view of its strategic importance at the border, which is seen even now; a citadel of this dynasty is located to the west of the Lạng Sơn town on a limestone rock outcrop.

Lạng Sơn was one of the 13 original provinces in northern Vietnam that were created under the reign of Emperor Minh Mạng in 1831; since the establishment of the Nguyễn dynasty in 1802 until then, northern Vietnam had been under the rule of a viceroy.

The town was occupied by the French in 1885 when it was a very prosperous town. The French converted it into a military base considered as important to their other base in Cao Bằng. In 1906, archaeologist Henri Mansuy discovered the Tham Kanh cave near Pho Binh Gia which he named the Ho Binh Gia. He unearthed unique stone implements and human remains. In 1922–25 M. Coloni extensively explored Lạng Sơn province and identified 43 sites related to the ancient Bac Son culture in the mountains.

During World War II, even though the Japanese had signed an agreement with Vichy Indo China, they soon reneged on the Agreement, without waiting for the ink to dry on the accord, and launched an offensive on Vietnam by withdrawing their troops from China. They crossed the Vietnam China border and entered  inside, very close to the Lạng Sơn railway station. The Japanese attacked on 22 September 1940 and by the 25th they captured Lạng Sơn. However, Vichy had lodged a protest with Emperor Hirohito for the breach of the agreement signed between the two countries, which resulted in a ceasefire to the hostilities by the evening of 26 September, and soon Lạng Sơn was reoccupied by the Vichy forces.

Democratic Republic of Vietnam and beyond
After Ho Chi Minh's government was established in September 1945, Japanese had surrendered to the British and Indian Army, under the terms of the Potsdam Conference, to the south of the 16th parallel, while the Chinese Nationalist Party (the Kuomintang). As strategy, Ho Chi Minh entered into an agreement with the French so that he could face any threat from the Chinese and a Franco-Vietnamese agreement was signed. This provided for a free Vietnam within the French Union and the Indochinese federation. However, the French launched an offensive against the Viet Minh in October 1947 with Lạng Sơn as their base. However, the Viet Minh managed to thwart the French Offensive and forced the French to withdraw to Lạng Sơn. However, the Viet Minh pursue the French Army, they had a very decisive victory on Highway 4 and they had to finally withdraw from Lạng Sơn. This marked the beginning of First Indochina War

In 1950 the Viet Minh took control of the province and the town. During February 1979, the Chinese invaded Vietnam through the border town of Don Dong ( to the north of Long Son town). In this war, which lasted for five days, 600,000 soldiers had descended on Vietnam; Lạng Sơn town was the major town that received the major thrust of 200,000 soldiers from China and occupied the capital city of the Northern Province. However, the Vietnamese had the last say as the Vietnamese army was successful in defeating the Chinese army, which bid a hasty retreat. This has achieved the status of a folk lore in the province. The frontier village, which became famous during the war with China, has remnants of the war on display to the visitors. However the border has been rebuilt and brisk trade flourishes between Vietnam and China through this town.
During the Chinese invasion in 1959 the Lan Son town was also severely damaged, however, it has been rebuilt since then. The old part of the town, near the Kyu Kung River has some interesting historical sites.

On June 7, 1949, the district of Lộc Bình was transferred from Hải Ninh province into Lạng Sơn. During the First Indochina War, Lạng Sơn was a part of Liên khu Việt Bắc. In 1950 the province had 10 districts: Bằng Mạc, Bắc Sơn, Bình Gia, Cao Lộc, Điềm He, Lộc Bình, Ôn Châu, Thoát Lãng, Tràng Định and Văn Uyên. On July 1, 1956, the district of Hữu Lũng of Bắc Giang province was transferred into Lạng Sơn, which was placed in the Khu tự trị Việt Bắc (Region of Northern Vietnam), which was formed the same day. The RNV lasted until December 27, 1975. In 1963 agricultural cooperativization began between the nationalities of the province. On December 16, 1964, the district of Điềm He and six communes of Bằng Mạc were merged to form the new district of Văn Quan; at the same time, the district of Ôn Châu and eight communes of Bằng Mạc district came together to form the new district of Chi Lăng. From December 27, 1975, until December 29, 1978, Lạng Sơn and Cao Bằng provinces were merged to form Cao Lạng Province, before being re-partitioned. At the same time, the district of Đình Lập in Quảng Ninh province was transferred to Lạng Sơn, and since then it has had its current 10 districts. In 1979, a Chinese attack on the border was defended.

Geography
The province is set in karstic limestone mountains and valleys. Mountains and forests comprise 80% of the province's area. The province measures approximately 123 kilometres from north to south and 126 kilometres from west to east. The Bac Son Mountains are located in the province and are calcareous in nature. Fertile valleys are framed by high mountain ridges, creating a scenic landscape.

The north of the province adjoins Cao Bằng province. The  Kỳ or Kyu River flows through Lạng Sơn town and alluvial plains are formed in the valley that is surrounded by high mountains of about  height. The river is part of the Tây Giang River basin in China.

Lạng Sơn has two international border crossings. The most accessed is the Friendship Gate called the Hữu Nghị Quan crossing at Đồng Đăng connecting to Pingxiang town in China. This is the historical first land link in the north between China and Vietnam that connects Lạng Sơn and Guangxi, China. The border is open daily, from 07:00 to 17:00, and involves a walk of 500 m through the no man's territory between Vietnam and China. There is an international train service, an express route, opened in 1996 from Hanoi to Beijing (China), which operates twice a week on Tuesday and Friday that passes through Lạng Sơn Town and Đồng Đăng through this gate which has three-hour stop at the border town to complete formalities of entry from one country to the other. Passengers are not allowed to board the train at any intermediate station between Hanoi and Beijing.

Lạng Sơn is 135 km from Cao Bằng on the National Highway no 4.

Administrative divisions
Lạng Sơn is subdivided into 11 district-level sub-divisions and 200 commune-level sub-divisions:

Demographics

The male population during this period was 399,410 while the female population was 382,245. The rural population was 621,841 against an urban population of 159,814 (about 26% of the rural population).

There are about 40 ethnic groups in Lạng Sơn recognized by the Vietnamese government. Each ethnicity has their own language, traditions, and subculture. Nùng comprised 42.90% of the population, followed by Tày at 36.08% and Vietnamese at 16.09%. The remainder are mostly Dao, Hoa, Sán Chay and Hmong.

Nung dialects include Nùng Phan Slinh in eastern Lạng Sơn, Nùng Cháo around Lạng Sơn city, and Nùng Inh in western Lạng Sơn.

Economy
Lạng Sơn's economy is 80% based on agriculture and forestry. The province has significant mining reserves of bauxite, phosphate and coal. It also has notable reserves of gold, silver and lead. Main crops include rice, which accounted for 40,000 hectares out of a total of 55,000 hectares grown in 1986, and sweet potato, maize and manioc. It is also known for its commodities of tea and yellow tobacco. These crops are generally grown in the valleys of the Bac Son Mountains, Binh Gia Mountains and the Van Quan Mountains and along the rivers plains of the Kỳ Cùng River and the Thuong River. Some of the districts such as Hữu Lũng District have sugar cane plantations and grow oranges and pineapples, others grow tea and plums. Animal husbandry is developed in Lạng Sơn Province; in 1986, 140,000 buffalo and oxen were recorded in the province and 150,000 pigs. The province is also noted for its That Khe duck speciality.

As against the national figure of 273 agriculture, forestry and fishery cooperatives, 15 are agricultural cooperatives and four are fisheries cooperatives. The number of cooperatives is 32 as against 7,592 cooperatives in the country. There are only 26 farms as against the national number of 120699.

The output value of agriculture produce at constant 1994 prices in the province was 1,076.5 billion đồngs against the national value of 156,681.9 billion đồngs.

In 2018, Lạng Sơn ranked 51st out of 63 provinces in terms of GDP, ranked 47th in GDP per capita, and ranked 20th in terms of growth.

Historical sites

Apart from the war-ravaged Đồng Đăng Border town, which has a rich war history that attracts many visitors, the other historical places of interest in the province are two large limestone caves located a short distance from Lạng Sơn town, and a 16th-century citadel of the Ming dynasty.

The two caves contain Buddhist altars, are well illuminated and are called the Tam Thanh Cave and the Nhi Thanh Cave. The Tam Thanh Cave is very large with three chambers, a water pond,  and has a window opening which provides scenic views of vast rice fields outside. The outer chamber of the cave on the right contains the Tam Giao Pagoda (built in 1777) with six shrines.  The second chamber of the cave on the left also has shrines. The Ngoc Tuyen River flows through this cave into the mountain, an unusual feature which is described as "a dramatic sight." The Nhi Thanh Cave, about 700 m away from and Tam Thanh Cave, were discovered in the 18th century by Ngô Thin Sy, a military commander at the Lạng Sơn garrison. His poems have been inscribed at the entrance to the cave. A plaque erected near the cave depicts a French resident of Lạng Sơn in full European dress. The Ngoc Tuyen River flows through the cave.

The Ming dynasty citadel, a 16th-century monument located in a desolate area on a rock outcrop, is bounded by the east–west facing walls and can be accessed using the Tam Tinh road from Lạng Sơn city. A series of steps from the roadside lead to the ruins of the citadel.

Lạng Sơn city also has ancient walls built in the 18th century.

Forests
The northern mountainous province is rich in biodiversity of flora and fauna in its rich forest. In the karstic limestone formations (also known as carbonate karst), which occupy 5% of the natural forest area of Vietnam Long Son and Cai Bang have an important place in the floral and faunal wealth of the forests. Northeast Viet Nam has 36% of the country's 1.15 million hectares of rocky mountains out of which Lạng Sơn and Cao Bằng provinces account for a substantial part of limestone formations. According to forest statistics of Vietnam these limestone formations have 69 mammal species; five of them are endemic and 26 are rare species. Village people value these formations as they are sources of water for agriculture. They also are sources of fuel wood, medicinal plants and housing materials for the villagers. In Lạng Sơn province they are rich source of water for irrigation of paddy crops. The limestone formations also permit growth of annona trees which provide substantial revenue to the villagers in Lạng Sơn; the average annual net yield from annona is reported to be about 12 million đồngs (US$775).

Star anise
The most important tree grown in Vietnam (and also in China) is the star anise (illicium verum, Hooker), an important spice; an evergreen tree which has aromatic lanceolate leaves. The Lạng Sơn province is the leading province with this tree species growth reported to cover 9000 ha, mostly in its Văn Quan District. Other provinces also have this species of trees but the coverage is very limited. Initially the tree belonged to the state farm enterprises under collective farming. However, since the 1990s, it has decontrolled and given the trees to village families to manage. The commercial production of star anise spice, which was 9,896 tonnes in 1997, has recorded a fall to 5,000 tonnes in 1999.

References

 
Northeast (Vietnam)
Provinces of Vietnam